"Roll Along Iowa" is one of three fight songs currently used by the University of Iowa Hawkeye Marching Band along with On Iowa and the Iowa Fight Song. The lyrics were written by John Woodman in 1954.

Lyrics

Roll along, Iowa, Roll down the field,
On to victory!
Roll along, Iowa, Don’t ever yield,
Always a winner be!
Get that ball, Give your all,
For dear Old Gold,
Raise her banner high!
With firm endeavor,
Roll on forever, U of I.

References
 University of Iowa Archives

Big Ten Conference fight songs
University of Iowa
American college songs
College fight songs in the United States
1954 songs